The Electoral district of Laverton is an electoral district of the Victorian Legislative Assembly in Australia. It was created in the redistribution of electoral boundaries in 2021, and came into effect at the 2022 Victorian state election.

It covers an area in the south western suburbs of Melbourne that was previously covered by the districts of Footscray, Tarneit, Altona, Kororoit and St Albans. It includes the suburbs of Sunshine, Braybrook, Albion, Ardeer, Sunshine West, Truganina, Laverton and Williams Landing.

Members for Laverton

Election results

See also

Parliaments of the Australian states and territories
List of members of the Victorian Legislative Assembly

References

External links
 Electorate profile: Laverton District, Victorian Electoral Commission

Laverton, Electoral district of
2022 establishments in Australia
City of Wyndham
City of Brimbank
Sunshine, Victoria
Electoral districts and divisions of Greater Melbourne